Events in the year 2022 in Djibouti.

Incumbents 

 President: Ismaïl Omar Guelleh
 Prime Minister: Abdoulkader Kamil Mohamed

Events 
Ongoing — COVID-19 pandemic in Djibouti

 30 August – The first ship carrying grain from Ukraine arrives in Djibouti.

Sports 

 18 June – 3 July: Djibouti at the 2022 World Aquatics Championships
 15 July – 24 July: Djibouti at the 2022 World Athletics Championships
 2021–22 Djibouti Premier League

References 

 
Djibouti
Djibouti
2020s in Djibouti
Years of the 21st century in Djibouti